Aptekarsky Ostrov may refer to:
Aptekarsky Island (Aptekarsky ostrov), an island on the Neva River in St. Petersburg, Russia
Aptekarsky Ostrov Municipal Okrug, a municipal okrug of Petrogradsky District of the federal city of St. Petersburg, Russia